Max Adler may refer to:

Max Adler (Sears) (1866–1952), American businessman and philanthropist
Max Adler (Marxist) (1873–1937), Austrian social theorist
Max Spencer Adler (died 1979), founder of Spencer Gifts
Max Adler (actor) (born 1986), American actor